The American Football Conference was a low-level American football minor league that operated between 1959 and 1961. The AFC was the first football league to operate teams in both the United States and Canada.

In 1961 the league held the longest title game in pro football history, when Sarnia Golden Bears beat Toledo Tornadoes 39-33 in three overtimes.

History
The American Football Conference was formed in July 1959 with the assistance of National Football League commissioner Bert Bell. It was an association of American football clubs that operated from 1959 to 1961 that were mostly based in Ohio, but had some teams from Pennsylvania, New Jersey, Michigan, and Canada. During its existence the AFC operated between semi-professional and minor league level (varied per team). After playing as a semi-professional league for the 1959 and 1960 seasons, the AFC became a minor professional league for the 1961 season.

The Columbus Colts played in the AFC in 1960, then left to help form the United Football League in 1961. A new franchise called the Ohio Colts replaced Columbus in the AFC for 1961.

The three biggest teams in the circuit were Toledo Tornadoes and Duquesne Ironmen that would join the United Football League and the Atlantic Coast Football League (respectively) and the Sarnia Golden Bears that had survived the collapse of the Ontario Rugby Football Union. Sarnia won the AFC's last championship after beating Toledo in three overtimes, the longest title game in pro football history.

The formation of the UFL and ACFL diminished the level of play, and although the circuit did not immediately die out, after 1961 it was now a purely semi-professional circuit, and the league dissolved entirely before the 1962 season.

1959

1960 

Larry Buckles (HB, Columbus) was the offensive MVP, Stan Jones (LB, Columbus) was the defensive MVP.

1961 

Championship Game: Sarnia 39, Toledo 33 (3OT)

References

Defunct American football leagues in the United States
Sports leagues established in 1959
1959 establishments in the United States
1961 disestablishments in the United States